The Ochsen (or Ochse) is a 2,188.4 metres high mountain in the Bernese Alps, overlooking Schwefelbergbad in the canton of Bern.  It is the highest mountain of the Gantrisch chain. The Louigrat is the easiest path (T3, slightly exposed at the top: very steep rocky passages), taking approximately 3 hours. Another path goes via the north ridge via Chli Ochsen (T4, steep, rocky and slippery). There is a memorial just below the small summit area.

References

External links
Ochsen on Hikr

Mountains of the Alps
Two-thousanders of Switzerland
Mountains of the canton of Bern
Mountains of Switzerland